Vessels is the fourth studio album by Australian melodic death metal band, Be'lakor, released on 24 June 2016.
Vessels won “Best Heavy Album” in The Age Music Victoria, an Australian industry-voted music award, awards in 2016.

Track listing

References

2016 albums
Be'lakor albums
Napalm Records albums